Thomas James Bernatowicz, from Washington University in St. Louis, was awarded the status of Fellow in the American Physical Society, having been nominated by their Division of Astrophysics in 1999.

Bernatowicz was educated at Washington University in St. Louis and Edinboro University of Pennsylvania.

Bernatowicz was recognized for his measurements of the double beta decay of 128Te and 130Te, and consequential limits of < 1.5 ev on the Majorana mass of the neutrino. He also has contributed to the discovery and laboratory study of ancient stardust, providing new insights into grain growth in stellar outflows.

References 

Fellows of the American Physical Society
American physicists
Living people
Year of birth missing (living people)
Washington University in St. Louis alumni
Washington University in St. Louis faculty
Edinboro University of Pennsylvania alumni